WLHR-LP (97.9 FM) is a low-power radio station licensed to Maryville, Tennessee, United States. The station is currently owned by East Maryville Baptist Church.

References

External links
 

LHR-LP
Maryville, Tennessee
LHR-LP